Top Country Albums is a chart that ranks the top-performing country music albums in the United States, published by Billboard.  In 1991, four different albums topped the chart; with effect from the issue dated May 25, Billboard changed its methodology for compiling the chart, basing it on electronic point of sale data provided by SoundScan Inc. rather than the method used since the chart's instigation of relying on sales reports submitted by a representative sample of stores nationwide.

In 1991, the top of the chart was dominated almost completely by Garth Brooks, who was at number one for 46 weeks of the year.  Brooks had reached number one for the first time in October of the previous year with No Fences.  Having been displaced by Put Yourself in My Shoes by Clint Black, the album returned to the top spot in February 1991 and remained atop the chart for 14 consecutive weeks.  After one week out of the peak position, it returned to number one and remained there for a further 18 weeks.  Its final total of 41 weeks at number one made it the second-longest-running Top Country Albums number one to date.  When it was finally displaced from the top spot, it was by Brooks's next album, Ropin' the Wind, which went straight into the chart at number one in the issue of Billboard dated September 28, beginning a run of 29 consecutive weeks atop the chart.  In the same week it became the first country album to debut at number one on the all-genres Billboard 200 Top Albums chart.

In addition to his success on the country charts, Brooks experienced a level of mainstream popularity and success in the early 1990s unprecedented for a country artist; by the end of 1991 No Fences was recognized as the highest-selling country album of all time, and by 2019 it had sold 17 million copies.  Brooks is ranked by the Recording Industry Association of America as the best-selling solo albums artist in the United States of any genre with more than 130 million domestic units sold by 2015, second only to the Beatles in overall album sales.  The only other artist to top the chart in 1991 was Dolly Parton, who spent a single week in the top spot in May with Eagle When She Flies.  Although she had topped the chart in 1987 with a collaborative album with Linda Ronstadt and Emmylou Harris, Eagle When She Flies was Parton's first solo album for more than 10 years to reach number one.  Its single week atop the chart interrupted what would otherwise have been a 14-month hold by Brooks on the number-one position.

Chart history

References

1991
1991 record charts